The Division of Chisholm is an Australian Electoral Division in Victoria located in the eastern suburbs of Melbourne. The division was created in 1949 and is named after Caroline Chisholm, a social worker and promoter of women's immigration. 

The Division's current MP is Carina Garland of the Australian Labor Party. The constituency is considered a key marginal constituency targeted by both Labor and the Liberal Party of Australia.

Geography
Since 1984, federal electoral division boundaries in Australia have been determined at redistributions by a redistribution committee appointed by the Australian Electoral Commission. Redistributions occur for the boundaries of divisions in a particular state, and they occur every seven years, or sooner if a state's representation entitlement changes or when divisions of a state are malapportioned.

The Division encompasses the suburbs of Ashwood, Blackburn, Blackburn North, Blackburn South, Box Hill, Box Hill North, Box Hill South, Burwood, Burwood East, Kerrimuir, and Laburnum. Additionally, the Division also includes parts of Chadstone, Forest Hill, Glen Waverley, Mount Waverley, Nunawading, Surrey Hills and Syndal.

Demographics 
The Division of Chisholm has a diverse population, with around 44% of its residents being born overseas. Approximately 43% of the population speak a language other than English at home, with Mandarin Chinese speakers making up around 20% of the population.

History

On its original boundaries, it was a comfortably safe Liberal seat centred on Camberwell. However, successive redistributions from 1980 onward have moved the electorate south-east, taking in strongly Labor-voting suburbs to balance out the relatively affluent Liberal-leaning suburbs in the north of the seat, and making the seat marginal. The first member for Chisholm, Sir Wilfrid Kent Hughes, was one of Australia's most distinguished soldiers and a former Olympian, who held the seat until his death on 31 July 1970.

Labor finally took the seat in the 1983 landslide that brought Bob Hawke to power, only to lose it in 1987. Anna Burke became the second Labor member ever to win it in 1998 election and held it until her retirement in 2016. Julia Banks won the seat for the Liberals at the 2016 election, becoming the only Liberal challenger to take a seat from Labor at that election. Taking this seat off Labor turned out to be crucial in ensuring the Coalition retaining its majority; it meant they had 76 seats, as opposed to the 75 they would have had if Labor had retained this seat.

On 27 November 2018, Banks resigned from the Liberal Party due to disaffection with the party resulting from the leadership spill which removed Malcolm Turnbull as Prime Minister and the treatment of women within the party. Banks announced she would sit on the crossbench as an independent, but guarantee confidence and supply to the Morrison Government.

Gladys Liu won Chisholm in the 2019 election for the Liberal Party against Jennifer Yang by less than 0.6%, becoming the first Chinese Australian to enter the lower house.

Members

Election results

References

External links
 Division of Chisholm - Australian Electoral Commission

Electoral divisions of Australia
Constituencies established in 1949
1949 establishments in Australia
City of Whitehorse
City of Monash
Electoral districts and divisions of Greater Melbourne